OCT station, also referred to as Overseas Chinese Town station in English, and formerly known as Huaqiaocheng station, is a station on Line 1 of the Shenzhen Metro. It opened on 28 December 2004. It is located underground at Shennan Dadao, near Shenzhen Bay Hotel, in Nanshan District, Shenzhen, China. The station is named after Overseas Chinese Town (OCT). It is also located close to Splendid China and China Folk Culture Village.

Station layout

Exits

See also 
Overseas Chinese Town

References

External links
 Shenzhen Metro OCT Station (Chinese)
 Shenzhen Metro OCT Station (English)

Railway stations in Guangdong
Shenzhen Metro stations
Nanshan District, Shenzhen
Railway stations in China opened in 2004
Railway stations located underground in China